The Monographs of the Society for Research in Child Development is a peer-reviewed academic journal published quarterly by Wiley-Blackwell. It is one of three journals published on behalf of the Society for Research in Child Development. The editor-in-chief is Ginger A. Moore (Pennsylvania State University). Each issue of Monographs contains a report on one single large-scale study or a group of papers on a common theme, often supplemented with an outside commentary.

According to the Journal Citation Reports, the journal has a 2021 impact factor of 7.2, ranking it 10th out of 61 journals in the category "Psychology, Developmental".

See also 
List of psychology journals

References

External links 
 

Child development
Publications established in 1935
Wiley-Blackwell academic journals
Developmental psychology journals
Quarterly journals
English-language journals
Academic journals associated with learned and professional societies of the United States